The 1976 Iowa Democratic presidential caucuses were held on January 19, 1976, the first nominating contest in the Democratic presidential primaries for the 1976 presidential election. It had the little-known Governor of Georgia Jimmy Carter campaign heavily and end up capturing 27.7% of the vote, the highest of the five candidates. An outpouring of media coverage of Carter soon emerged.

Candidates
 Birch Bayh, U.S. Senator from Indiana
 Jimmy Carter, Governor of Georgia
 Fred R. Harris, former U.S. Senator from Oklahoma
 Henry M. Jackson, U.S. Senator from Washington
 Sargent Shriver, former U.S. Ambassador to France
 Mo Udall, U.S. Representative for

Results

Uncommitted won 14,508 votes (37%) and Carter 10,764 votes (27%). Birch Bayh, a Senator from Indiana got 5,148 (13%). Udall dropped to 5th place with only 6%, behind Fred R. Harris of Oklahoma, which led to Harris coining the term "winnowed in" to refer to his surprisingly-strong showing.

References

Notes

Iowa
Democratic presidential caucuses
1976